Kerry Andrew (born 5 April 1978) is an English composer, performer and author.

Kerry has a PhD in Composition from the University of York and is the winner of four British Composer Awards. Andrew's debut novel, Swansong, was published by Vintage in January 2018 and a second, Skin, in 2021. Andrew was shortlisted for the BBC National Short Story Award 2018 and again in 2022.

Career 
From age 3 to age 6, Andrew lived in Canada with her family.  The family subsequently returned to the UK and settled in the Buckinghamshire area. Andrew earned a BA in Music, MA and PhD in Composition, all from the University of York.

Andrew was Composer in Residence at Handel House Museum during 2010-12, and was Visiting Professor of Music at Leeds College of Music in 2015-16 and 2017-18. She won her first British Composer Award in the Making Music Category in 2010 for her choral work 'Fall', and won two awards in 2014, in the Stage Works category for her wild swimming chamber opera 'Dart's Love' and in the Community or Educational category for her community chamber opera 'Woodwose,' written for Wigmore Hall, and for which she also wrote the libretto. She won her fourth award, in the Music for Amateur Musicians category, for 'who we are', a piece for the massed National Youth Choirs of Great Britain, premiered at the Royal Albert Hall in 2016.

Andrew's 'No Place Like,' was written for the BBC Ten Pieces scheme, and received BBC Proms performances in both 2017 and 2018. She has written large scale pieces for young and non-professional ensembles, including 400 Lewisham-based primary school children at the Royal Festival Hall; for Animate Orchestra, the Junior Trinity Symphony Orchestra and 500 singers of the South London Riverside Partnership at the Royal Albert Hall; and for the massed choirs of the National Youth Choirs of Great Britain at the Royal Albert Hall in her piece 'who we are.' She created a concept drawing and vocal EP A Lock Is A Gate for Art on the Underground in 2011, and a work simultaneously performed by 25 community ensembles around the UK for the Landmark Trust. In 2015, she wrote a piece for the London Sinfonietta to fight for the National Health Service (featuring the recorded voices of 60 members of the public, including actor/campaigner Michael Sheen).

Andrew was a British Council/PRS for Music Foundation Musician in Residence in China in Spring 2016, spending five weeks in the Henan Province in 2016. She made collaborative new rock/traditional-inspired songs based on foxes in folklore.

Andrew's choral works have been published by Faber Music and by Oxford University Press, including in Carols for Choirs.  Her vocal trio piece The Song of Doves concluded the national memorial service for the victims of the 7 July bombings, receiving national broadcast live on the BBC and other news outlets.  Her composition Dusk Songs was commissioned and recorded by The Ebor Singers, and released by Boreas Music in 2007.  Elsewhere, her work has been recorded on the Naxos and Nonclassical labels, and choral premieres have been given by the National Youth Choirs of Great Britain, The Hilliard Ensemble, ORA Singers, the Joyful Company of Singers and Alamire.

Andrew performs with the vocal trio Juice Vocal Ensemble, who have released two albums on the Nonclassical label, which include her music, as well as a collaborative album with David Thomas Broughton. They have collaborated with the likes of Anna Meredith, Gavin Bryars, Shlomo, Errollyn Wallen and Mica Levi.

She performs alt-folk under the name You Are Wolf. Her debut album, Hawk to the Hunting Gone (2014, Stone Tape), explored British birds and folklore. Her second album, Keld (Firecrest, 2018) was awarded fRoots magazine's Editor's Choice! Album of the Year 2018 and chosen by the Guardian as a Top Ten Folk Album 2018. She has collaborated with Robert Macfarlane and Jackie Morris, setting texts from their book The Lost Words.

She is a multi-instrumentalist with the band DOLLYman.

From 2007-17, she sang with Laura Cole's jazz ensemble, Metamorphic.

Andrew has written libretto for her own music-theatre works and articles for The Guardian. She made her short story debut on BBC Radio 4's Stories from Songwriters Series in 2014, and Jonathan Cape published her debut novel, Swansong], in January 2018. She was shortlisted for the BBC National Short Story Award in 2018 for her story 'To Belong To', which was broadcast on BBC Radio 4, read by Tobias Menzies.
Andrew occasionally appears as a presenter on BBC Radio 3's Hear and Now and has been a frequent guest on BBC Radio 3 and 4, including The Essay in 2018, and a guest mix for Late Junction in 2017. She was the Chair of the Judges on BBC Young Musician 2018.

Selected compositions

Choral Music 
 maranatha (2004) SATB choir
 dusksongs (2005) compline mass for SATB choir and percussion
 hevene quene (2006) SATB choir
 Drop, Drop Slow Tears (2007) SATB choir and piano
 York Mass (2008) SATB choir
 the ivy and the holly (2008) SATB choir
 The Cherry Tree Carol (2009) SATB choir
 hexennacht (2009) SSAA choir
 Fall (2010) SATB choir
 Magnificat (2010) SATB choir
 adam and the mother (2011) SATB choir
 The Earth Hath Voice (2011) SATB choir
 Out of the Orient Crystal Skies (2011) SATB choir
 Rhymes and Charms for Fly-Away Things (2011) SATB choir and piano
 A Still Roar (2012) SATB choir and organ
 where the marsh plants grow (2012) SSAATTBB single voices
 All Things Are Quite Silent, arr. (2012) SATB choir
 The London Breed (2014) Large-scale young people's choir, symphony orchestra, experimental orchestra
 The Dream of the Rood (fragments) (2015) SATB Choir
 CoMAblues (2016) from 6 voices to any number of voices
 who we are (2016) Large-scale choirs/ (or) SATB choir
 Thy Flight Be Fleet! trainsongs (2016) SATB choir, children's chorus and symphony orchestra
 Psalm 150 (2016) SATB choir
 Two Bird Proverbs (2016) SSA single voices, SATB choir
 Listen To Us (2017) children's chorus, rhythm trio
 No Place Like (2017) children's chorus, SATB choir / children's chorus with optional piano and classroom percussion
 By Any Other Name (2017) SSAATTBB
wave (2018) SSSAA (junior girls choir, senior girls choir)
Charm (2018) SSAA (youth voices)
Under The Same Sky (2018) SSAA (youth voices)

Other vocal music 
 fruit songs (2001) soprano and guitar (also arrangements for soprano and chamber ensemble, and soprano and piano)
 luna-cy (2001) SSA single voices
 lullaby for the witching hour (2004) SSA single voices
 ojo (2004) SSA single voices
 sundial songs (2005) counter-tenor and prepared piano
 the song of doves (2006) SSA single voices
 hammock (2008) soprano and 'cello
 Goodnight Irene, arr. (2012) SSA single voices
 Night-time Songs, arr. (2013) SSA single voices
 apples, plums, cherries (The Cherry Tree Carol) (2015) SSA single voices
hollyberry song (2016) SSA single voices, wine glasses

Opera and music-theatre 
 sedna stories (2005) music-theatre work for SSA single voices and chamber ensemble with electronics by Paul J Abbott and visuals by Harriet Poole
 Woodwose (2013) community chamber opera for tenor solo, children's choruses, adult community choir, older voices and chamber ensemble
 Dart's Love: a wild swimming chamber opera (2013) for baritone, soprano, three female voices and chamber ensemble
Fox-Pop: A Snappy Opera (2017) for children's voices, bass clarinet, electric piano and trash drum kit
Butterfly Brain (2018) for narrator, soprano/instrumentalist, 'cellist/vocalist and percussionist/vocalist, words by Laura Dockrill

Chamber ensemble 
 I think you'll find that I'M the man (2007), chamber ensemble
 Pollack (2010), chamber ensemble
 bad-luck birds (2012) recorder quintet
 NHS (2015) soprano and chamber ensemble, with recorded community voices
 THE, WHAT IS IT? THE GOLDEN EAGLE? (2017) chamber ensemble
tInItUs sOnGs (2018) string quartet and recorded spoken word

Other educational and community work 
 beginning with blobs (2008) theatre work for actor-singers and recorded chamber ensemble
 A Lock is a Gate (Art on the Underground) (2011) concept drawing and vocal album: children's spoken word, song and field recordings
 Lines, Loops, Bones and Stones (2015) flexible ensembles
 songchants (2016), children's voices and string quartet
 The Sky Begins to Change (2017), for solo voice, early/folk chamber ensemble, recorded voices

Discography

Juice Vocal Ensemble 
 Songspin (2010), Nonclassical 
 Laid Bare: Love Songs (2014), Nonclassical 
 Sliding the Same Way with David Thomas Broughton (2014), Song by Toad
Snow Queens (2018), Resonus Classics

You Are Wolf 
 hunting little songs, EP (2010), Mulberry House
 Hawk to the Hunting Gone, (2014), Stone Tape
Keld, (2018), Firecrest

Choral 
 Dusksongs, The Ebor Singers (2007), Boreas Music
 York Mass, The Ebor Singers, (2009), Boreas Music

DOLLYman 
 DOLLYman (2010), self-release
 Have Yourself a DOLLY DOLLY Christmas (2013), self-release
 Ponderous Skiffle Rubbish (2015), self-release

Metamorphic 
 The Rock Between (2011), F-ire
 Coalescence (2013), F-ire

Selected publications

References

External links

 Official Kerry Andrew website
 Juice experimental vocal trio website
 You Are Wolf website
The Times: Laura Mvula, Kerry Andrew and Caroline Shaw
The Guardian: Kerry Andrew You Are Wolf interview
The Guardian: Kerry Andrew Swansong Interview Debut Novel
 "Kerry Andrew - An Interview", Opera Today, 12 January 2010
 "Kerry Andrew Interview (Part One)", PRS for Music Members' Magazine, 6 December 2010
 "Kerry Andrew Interview (Part Two)", PRS for Music Members' Magazine, 6 December 2010

Alumni of the University of York
English composers
1978 births
Living people
People from High Wycombe
British women composers
Musicians from Buckinghamshire
21st-century English women singers
21st-century English singers